Margaret Anne "Peggy" Kirk Bell (October 28, 1921 – November 23, 2016) was an American professional golfer and golf instructor known for her strong advocacy of women's golf. She was elected to the World Golf Hall of Fame, class of 2019, in the lifetime achievement category.

Born in Findlay, Ohio, Peggy started playing golf at age 17. She took to the game immediately and quickly won a number of titles. She played college golf at Rollins College. She was a member of Kappa Kappa Gamma. She played the ladies amateur tour in the 1940s before the development of a professional tour, winning three Ohio Amateurs and the 1949 Titleholders Championship and North and South Women's Amateur. She was also a member of the 1950 U.S. Curtis Cup team.

At that time she competed as Peggy Kirk, and in 1953 she married her high school sweetheart, Warren "Bullet" Bell, who had played professional basketball with the Fort Wayne Pistons before turning to business. Warren died in 1984.

In 1990, she was voted the Bob Jones Award, the highest honor given by the United States Golf Association in recognition of distinguished sportsmanship in golf. She became the first woman voted into the World Golf Teachers Hall of Fame in 2002.

Bell owned the Pine Needles Resort in Southern Pines, North Carolina.  Her older daughter, Bonnie, is married to former PGA Tour member Pat McGowan. Bell died there in November 2016 at the age of 95.

Major championships

Wins (1)

Team appearances
Amateur
Curtis Cup (representing the United States): 1950 (winners)

References

External links

Peggy Kirk Bell Girls Golf Tour. pkbgt.org.

American female golfers
Rollins Tars women's golfers
LPGA Tour golfers
Winners of LPGA major golf championships
World Golf Hall of Fame inductees
Golfers from Ohio
Golfers from North Carolina
People from Findlay, Ohio
People from Southern Pines, North Carolina
1921 births
2016 deaths